Vasila Hajiyeva (Azerbaijani: Vəsilə Hacıyeva Cümşüd qızı born on April 12, 1969 in Baku, Azerbaijan), is an Azerbaijani political scientist, Professor of Political Science.

Education and degrees
 Doctor of Sciences on Politics (D.Sc. - equivalent to a Habilitation). (defense-2011, diploma-2012). The Academy of Public Administration at the President of the Republic of Azerbaijan, Baku. Thesis titled “Complex Systems Research of Politics”.,
 Post-doctoral researcher. (2007-2009). Department of Political Science and Political Sociology. Institute of Philosophy and Law. Azerbaijan National Academy of Sciences.
 Candidate of Sciences on Politics (PhD) (defense-2004, diploma-2005). The Academy of Public Administration at the President of the Republic of Azerbaijan, Baku, Azerbaijan. Thesis titled “Information Support of Politics”.,
 Post-graduate student. (1997-2001). The Academy of Public Administration at the President of the Republic of Azerbaijan, Baku, Azerbaijan.
 Systems Engineer. (1986-1991 – higher education). Computer Science. Azerbaijan Technical University, Baku, Azerbaijan.

Academic titles 
 Professor at the Department of Political Science and International Relations. By the decision of the Supreme Attestation Commission attached to the President of the Republic of Azerbaijan dated March 14, 2017 (Minutes 05-k).
 Associate Professor at the Department of Political Science and International Relations. By the decision of the Supreme Attestation Commission attached to the President of the Republic of Azerbaijan dated January 27, 2015 (Minutes 04-k).

Research experience 
 2016 – 2017 (Spring Semester). Visiting Scholar. Davis Center for Russian and Eurasian Studies. Harvard University, United States.,
 2014 – 2015. Visiting Scholar. REEES - Russian, East European and Eurasian Studies Centre.

Selected publications 
 Political Organism: Elements, Relations, Processes. 2008. In Azerbaijani. Bakı: “Elm”. 336 s.,
 Complex view to politics. 2003. In Azerbaijani. Bakı: “Azərbaycan Universiteti”. 186 s.
 Intellectual liberalism: a theoretical way based on the legacy of Turkic thought. 2022. ISJ Theoretical & Applied Science, 05 (109), 38-49. Philadelphia, USA ,
 Political scene and political culture in the clash of generations: analysis of early parliamentary elections on February 9, 2020 in Azerbaijan. 2020. ISJ Theoretical & Applied Science, 11 (91), 227-239. Philadelphia, USA ,
 To Oligarchy through Democracy or to Disorder through Order. 2018. ISJ Theoretical & Applied Science, 10(66): 235-247. Philadelphia, USA ,
 EU’s Policy for Azerbaijan: Challenges, Errors and Opportunities. 2015. Akademik Bakış Dergisi. SayıI 52. Kasım - Aralık. Uluslararası Hakemli Sosyal Bilimler E-Dergisi. İktisat ve Girişimçilik Üniversitesi, Türk Dünyası.
 Problem of Globalizing of Democracy in the Context of Correlation of Local, Regional and Global Conditions. In Proceedings of the 23rd World Congress of Political Science, organized by the International Political Science Association (IPSA), Montreal, Canada, July 19-24, 2014. DASH at Harvard,
 Correlation between Philosophy and Politics: Complex Systems Approach to the Question. In Proceedings of the 23rd World Congress of Philosophy (WCP 2013), Athens, Greece, August 4 – 10, 2013. DASH at Harvard,
 On Correlation between Politics and Law. DASH at Harvard,
 On Stability and Sustainability of Political System. DASH at Harvard,
 Turkey and New World System. 2013. Geostrategy. N 02 (14). Baku.
 Law Problem of International Relations. 2012. Geostrategy. N 03 (09). Baku. 
 Global Crisis: Reasons, Directions, Solution Ways. 2010. In Russian. Век глобализации. V.1. Москва. Россия.;         
 Two Basic Sides of the Global Order and Disorder in the Modern Period – Democratization and Conflicts. 2010. In Azerbaijani. “Fəlsəfə və sosial-siyasi elmlər” jurnalı, V. 4(28).  Bakı.        
 Systematic Approach to the Local, Regional and Global Security. 2009. In Turkish. (Yerel, bölgesel ve küresel güvenliye doğru yaklaşım). “2023” Dergisi, sayı 94, Ankara, Türkiye.                     
 On Correlation between Politics and Law. 2009. In Russian. (К вопросу о соотношении политики и права). Мир человека. Философский и общественно-гуманитарный журнал. №2 (40). Алма-Ата, Казахыстан.
 Azerbaijanizm and Turkizm in the National Ideological System. The Philosopher’s Index. An International Index to Philosophical Periodicals and Books. V.44, N 4, 4-th quarter, P.383, 2010. “Philosopher’s Information Center”, USA; 2009. 
 Conditions of the Optimum Geopolitical Activities. 2009. In Azerbaijani. BDU-nun xəbərləri. Humanitar elmlər seriyası, №1.  Bakı. 
 Coordination Between Politics and Economy. 2008. In Azerbaijani. AMEA-nın xəbərləri. İqtisadiyyat elmləri seriyası. N 2. Bakı. 
 The Network of Internal and External Relations of Political System. 2008. In Azerbaijani. “Fəlsəfə və sosial-siyasi elmlər” jurnalı, N 4. Bakı. 
 Relations between Politics and Philosophy in Terms of Ideology. 2008. In Azerbaijani. “Fəlsəfə və sosial-siyasi elmlər” jurnalı, N 4(22). Bakı. 
 Moral Criteria of Politics. 2007. In Azerbaijani. Pedaqoji Universitetin xəbərləri. N 3. Bakı.

Fields of interest 
Political theory, complexity theory, democracy, international relations, world politics and comparative politics

International relations

Editorial membership 
 Editorial Advisory Board member. New Horizons. Research Journal. Faculty of Social Sciences. Greenwich University. Karachi-Pakistan.
 Editorial Board member. "Metafizika" International Journal of Philosophy and Interdisciplinary Research. ISSN 2616-6879. Baku. Azerbaijan.

Projects 
Institutional Coordinator. Erasmus Mundus 2013 ‒ 2017. Partnership title: “Education Force: Driving Mobility for EU - East Europe cooperation”

Political activity 
Central Election Commission of the Republic of Azerbaijan (CEC) approved the candidacy of Vasila Hajiyeva to deputy on Khatai second Con.EC  #34 in the Elections to the Milli Majlis (parliament) of the Republic of Azerbaijan, dated February 9, 2020. 

 From this circle, the ruling party nominated Mikhail Zabelin. Vasila Hajiyeva was considered by the public as the main opponent for Mikhail Zabelin.
The election campaign was conducted under unequal conditions. Thus, while all the executive structures of Khatai district were mobilized for Zabelin, the executive power prevented posters of Vasila Hajiyeva from being outside the polling boards. Moreover, posters of Vasila Hajiyeva were regularly removed from election boards till election day.  In addition, three other persons with surname of Hajiyeva and Hajiyev were nominated as candidates for the presence in the ballot papers on Hajiyev's name (these people did not campaign in the area). 
On February 10, 2020, Vasila Hajiyeva addressed the public about the fraudulent victory of Mikhail Zabelin on election day (February 9, 2020) with reliable facts about the violation of the electoral rights of voters and total fraud. ,  
On February 12, 2020, Vasila Hajiyeva filed a complaint against the actions (inactions) and decisions violating citizens’ election rights in the Election to the Milli Majlis, appointed to February 9, 2020. 
On February 17, 2020, during a session of the Central Election Commission (CEC) made a decision related to the Khatai second Con.EC # 34.
On February 20, 2020, Vasila Hajiyeva filed a complaint against the decision of the CEC to the Baku Court of Appeal. The Baku Court of Appeal found the dispute in favor of the CEC by a decision of February 22, 2020, not satisfying the lawsuit.

References

External links 
 “Gəncləşmək demək, estafetin yaşlı nəsildən daha çox orta nəslə ötürülməsi kimi anlaşılmalıdır” - Professor;
 “PROF. VƏSILƏ HACIYEVA 9 FEVRAL 2020-CI ILDƏ KEÇIRILƏCƏK PARLAMENT SEÇKILƏRINDƏ 34 SAYLI XƏTAI IKINCI DAIRƏSINDƏN NAMIZƏDLIYINI IRƏLI SÜRMÜŞDÜR”;
 Qərb Universitetinin professoru Harvard Universitetində dəvətli alim kimi fəaliyyət göstərəcək;
 “Rusiya və Qərbin vizyonları bir-birinə ziddir və...” - Professor Vəsilə Hacıyeva; 
 “Rusiya və Qərbin vizyonları bir-birinə ziddir və...” - Professor Vəsilə Hacıyeva; 
 “Professor Vəsilə Hacıyeva: Rusiya və Qərbin vizyonları bir-birinə ziddir"; 
 “Professor Vəsilə Hacıyeva: Rusiya və Qərbin vizyonları bir-birinə ziddir"; 
 Qərb Universitetinin ABŞ – Azərbaycan münasibətlərini tədqiq edən professoru-Vəsilə Hacıyeva; 
 Professor Vəsilə Hacıyeva: Əgər siyasətin misiyası bir nizam yaratmaq, quruculuq, böyümək, inkşafdırsa orda qadının yeri mərkəzi yerdir; 
 Azərbaycanlı alim Harvard Universitetinə dəvət aldı;
 Vəsilə Hacıyeva YouTube kanalı

Academic staff of the Academy of Public Administration (Azerbaijan)
Azerbaijani political scientists
Azerbaijani professors
Azerbaijani women academics
1969 births
Living people
Women political scientists